was a subprefecture of Okinawa Prefecture, Japan. It was abolished in March 2009. Most of its functions were taken over by the Yaeyama Office of the prefecture.

It included the following cities and towns of Yaeyama and Senkaku Islands:

Ishigaki (city on Ishigaki and Senkaku Islands)
Taketomi (town on Iriomote, Taketomi, Kohama, Kuroshima, Hateruma, Hatoma, and others)
Yonaguni (town on Yonaguni)

Offices
Yaeyama Subprefecture: 438-1 Maezato, Ishigaki-shi, Okinawa-ken. 907-0002

External links
 Official website
 

Subprefectures in Okinawa Prefecture